Reiner Modest (born 6 July 1949) is a Danish rower. He competed in the men's quadruple sculls event at the 1980 Summer Olympics.

References

1949 births
Living people
Danish male rowers
Olympic rowers of Denmark
Rowers at the 1980 Summer Olympics
Sportspeople from Frederiksberg